Children's Discovery Museum Bangkok 1, or formerly known as Bangkok Children's Discovery Museum is a museum in Bangkok, Thailand, considered as the first museum and learning centre for children in Thailand and Southeast Asia. It is situated on the southern edge of Queen Sirikit Park, opposite Sunday Market (an ornamental fish market, a part of Chatuchak Weekend Market).

It was founded after the initiation of H.M.Queen Sirikit in order for Thai youth to receive a broader learning. Dr.Bhichit Rattakul governor of Bangkok at the time, took action under H.M.instruction, by arranging a part of Queen Sirikit Garden (about 2 acres in size) to build the Children's Discovery Museum. The project started in early 2000, and finished in mid-2001, during the time when Samak Sundaravej was the governor of Bangkok.

The museum consists of 3 exhibiting buildings, a conference room and service areas indoor and outdoor. The total area is more than 10,000 square metres. It is utilized for activities, learning and recreation. The Bangkok Children's Discovery Museum Foundation in order to provide services and learning with the highest quality and efficiency.

References

Museums in Bangkok
Children's museums
Museums established in 2001
2001 establishments in Thailand
Child-related organizations in Thailand